Jean-Baptiste Jacques Augustin (August 15, 1759 – April 13, 1832) was a French miniature painter.

Biography 
Augustin was born in Saint-Dié-des-Vosges and died in Paris. He might have had some lessons from Jean-Baptiste Claudot and maybe also from Jean Girardet in Nancy. After a few months in Dijon in 1781 he arrived in Paris the same year where he soon earned fame. During the French Revolution days he travelled to Brest (1789) and to Saint-Dié-des-Vosges (1791).

In 1800 he married his pupil Pauline Ducruet, 22 years younger than him. He worked for Napoleon and his entourage and, in 1806, received a gold medal in recognition of his skills. In 1814 Louis XVIII appointed him peintre ordinaire du Cabinet du roi,  later peintre des Affaires étrangères, and in 1819 peintre en miniature de la Chambre et du Cabinet du roi. In 1821 he was awarded the Légion d’honneur. In 1791 he exhibited at the Exposition de la Jeunesse, and from then until 1831 he also took part in the Paris Salon. He died of  cholera in 1832 and was buried at Père Lachaise Cemetery. Alongside Isabey, Augustin was the most significant teacher of miniature painting of his time; he taught over 400 pupils including Besselièvre, Borel, Comte, Delacazette, Delatour, Fontallard, Mirbel, Sieurac, Sparrgren and Tixier de Ladouce.

Famous people painted by Augustin 

 Louis Hector Chalot de Saint-Mart
 Louis-Joseph de Bourbon, prince de Condé
 Napoleon I and his family
 Louis XVIII, king of France
 Louis-Philippe d'Orléans, duke of Orléans (1773–1850)
 Marquise de Ségonzac
 Madame Récamier (1777–1849)
 Laurence Geneviève Vanhee, née Devinck, wife of the banker
 General Laconpérie
 Charles Antoine Callamard (1776–1821) Paris, Louvre
 Charles-Ferdinand, duke of Berry (1778–1820)
 Antoine Denis Chaudet (1763–1810), sculptor
 Madame de Kercado
 Louis Joseph Auguste Coutan (1779–1830)
 Marie Joseph Georges Rousse, the former president of the Chambre des notaires de Paris
 Anne de Dorat, countess Coiffier de Moret
Anne Josephe Theroigne de Mericourt (1762–1817), a French Revolution pasionaria

Bibliography
 Henri Bouchot, La Miniature française de 1750 à 1825, Goupil, 1907.
 Maria Carmen Espinosa Martín, Iluminaciones, pequeños retratos y miniaturas, Madrid, Fundación Lázaro Galdiano, 1999, 362 p.
 Fleuriot de Langle et Schlumberger, "Les miniatures de Jacques Augustin", Connaissance des Arts, n° 69, November 1957
 Camille Mauclair, Les Miniatures de l'Empire et de la Restauration, portraits de femmes, Paris, H. Piazza, 1913, 137 p.
 Bernd Pappe, „Jean-Baptiste Jacques Augustin et son atelier à Paris“, in: Nicole Garnier-Pelle (Hrsg.), La miniature en Europe. Actes du colloque organisé par la fondation pour la sauvegarde et le développement du domaine de Chantilly, Maison de Sylvie, 10 et 11 octobre 2007, Paris 2008, p. 100-105.
 Bernd Pappe, „Augustin Dubourg, Augustin fils/neveu et Joseph-Ange Augustin: trois artistes d’une même famille dans l’ombre de leur célèbre parent“, in: Nathalie Lemoine-Bouchard (ed.), La miniature en Europe. Des portraits de propagande aux oeuvres éléphantesques, Paris 2013, S. 58–62.
 Bernd Pappe, „Jean-Baptiste Jacques Augustin et Louis Febvrel, une amitié à distance mais de longue durée“, in: Nathalie Lemoine-Bouchard (ed.), Lettre de la miniature, Nr. 18, 2013, S. 3–5.
 Bernd Pappe, „Le carnet d’esquisses de Pauline Augustin : quatre miniatures capitales et leurs dessins préparatoires“, in: Nathalie Lemoine-Bouchard (ed.), Lettre de la miniature, Nr. 31, 2015, S. 3–8.
 Bernd Pappe (ed.): Jean-Baptiste Jacques Augustin. Peintre en miniature. Saint-Dié des Vosges, 2010,  (exhibition catalogue, Musée Pierre-Noël, Saint-Dié-des-Vosges, 17 April - 20 June 2010).
 Bernd Pappe: Jean-Baptiste Jacques Augustin 1759–1832. Une nouvelle excellence dans l'art du portrait en miniature. Scripta, Verona 2015, .
 Charles Peccatte, "Jean Baptiste Jacques Augustin", Bulletin de la Société philomatique vosgienne, t. XXXIX, p. 61-88
 J. L. Propert, History of Miniature Art, London, 1887.
 Albert Ronsin (under the direction of), Les Vosgiens célèbres. Dictionnaire biographique illustré, Vagney (88120), Éditions Gérard Louis, 1990, 394 p.
 H. Roujon, "La Miniature", Illustration, Christmas 1912
 Gaston Save, „Jacques Augustin“, Bulletin de la société philomatique vosgienne, 1880–81, Nr. 6, S. 91-102.
 Gaston Save, „Jacques Augustin“, Bulletin de la société philomatique vosgienne, 1881–82, Nr. 7, S. 103–111.
 Gaston Save, Augustin, miniaturiste lorrain, Nancy 1888.
 G. C. Williamson, History of Portrait Miniatures, 1904.

See also 
 Portrait miniature

External links 

1759 births
1832 deaths
People from Saint-Dié-des-Vosges
Burials at Père Lachaise Cemetery
18th-century French painters
French male painters
19th-century French painters
19th-century French male artists
18th-century French male artists